= Interstate Commerce Committee =

- United States House Committee on Interstate and Foreign Commerce (1891–1981), which became the United States House Committee on Energy and Commerce
- United States Senate Committee on Interstate Commerce (1887–1947) or Interstate and Foreign Commerce (1947–1961), which merged into the United States Senate Committee on Commerce, Science, and Transportation
